Arne Christopher Lerum (July 20, 1879 – June 25, 1911) was an American football player and coach. He served as the head football coach at the University of Wisconsin–Stevens Point–then known as Stevens Point Normal School–in 1904, compiling a record of 1–2. Lerum selected as a guard on the 1901 All-Western college football team while playing for Wisconsin.  Lerum immigrated to the United States from Bergen, Norway when he was 14.  He was active in politics in as a Republican in the state of Wisconsin.  Lerum died on cancer on June 25, 1911, in Madison, Wisconsin.

Head coaching record

References

External links
 

1879 births
1911 deaths
19th-century players of American football
American football guards
Wisconsin Badgers football players
Wisconsin–Stevens Point Pointers football coaches
Wisconsin Republicans
Norwegian emigrants to the United States
Sportspeople from Bergen
Deaths from cancer in Wisconsin